Pietrişu may refer to several villages in Romania:

 Pietrişu, a village in Găujani Commune, Giurgiu County
 Pietrişu, a village in Curtișoara Commune, Olt County
 Pietrişu, a village in Poiana Câmpina Commune, Prahova County
 Pietrişu, a village in the town of Băile Olăneşti, Vâlcea County

Others 
 Pietrișul Creek, a right tributary of the Mureş River in Romania

See also 
 Piatra (disambiguation)
 Pietriș (disambiguation)
 Pietreni (disambiguation)
 Pietrari (disambiguation)
 Pietrosu (disambiguation)
 Pietroasa (disambiguation)
 Pietroșani (disambiguation)
 Pietricica (disambiguation)